Nelida Milani (born Pula, 1939) is an Istrian Italian writer from Croatia. Jointly with Anna Maria Mori, she was the recipient of the Rapallo Carige Prize for Bora in 1999.

References

Croatian women writers
Croatian novelists
Croatian women novelists
20th-century Croatian writers
20th-century novelists
20th-century Croatian women writers
20th-century linguists
21st-century Croatian writers
21st-century novelists
21st-century Croatian women writers
21st-century linguists
Croatian people of Italian descent
People from Pula
1939 births
Living people
Women linguists
Linguists from Croatia